Anil Vij (born 15 March 1953) is an Indian politician belonging to the Bharatiya Janata Party and Cabinet Minister in the Government of Haryana.

Political career 
Vij joined Akhil Bharatiya Vidyarthi Parishad, a student wing of Rashtriya Swayamsevak Sangh, while he was studying at S. D. College, Ambala Cantt.

In 1970, he became General Secretary of ABVP. Vij worked actively with Vishav Hindu Parishad, Bharat Vikas Parishad BMS and other such organisations. Vij joined the State Bank of India in 1974.

In 1990, when Sushma Swaraj was elected to Rajya Sabha, the Ambala Cantonment seat became vacant. Vij was asked to resign from service and contest a by-election by the BJP Party.

He contested the election and won. In 1991 he became State President Of Bharatiya Janata Yuva Morcha. In 1996 and 2000, he contested as an independent candidate and won both times.

In 2005, Vij lost re-election. In 2009, he was elected as Bhartiya Janata Party's Member of the Legislative Assembly (India) (MLA) from Ambala Cantonment constituency in the Haryana Legislative Assembly.

In 2014, Vij was again elected as Bharatiya Janata Party's MLA Ambala Cantonment.

In 2019, Vij was again elected for the sixth time as Bharatiya Janata Party's MLA Ambala Cantonment.

On 20 November 2020, Vij becomes the first in his state to volunteer for the anti-COVID vaccine. He was administered a trial dose in a Ambala Cantonment hospital.

Cabinet Minister of Haryana
On 26 October 2014, Vij was inducted in the Government of Haryana as a Cabinet Minister. with the independent charge of the following departments:
Department of Home affairs, Haryana Ayush, Health Services, Medical Education, Science & Technology, and Sports & Youth Affairs, Haryana.

References

1953 births
Living people
Haryana MLAs 2014–2019
Haryana MLAs 2019–2024
People from Ambala
State cabinet ministers of Haryana
Indian Hindus
Bharatiya Janata Party politicians from Haryana